"Life Is Just a Bowl of Cherries" is a popular song with music by Ray Henderson and lyrics by Lew Brown, published in 1931. Ethel Merman introduced this song in George White's Scandals of 1931. A Rudy Vallée version, recorded in 1931, spent five weeks in the top-10 pop music charts.  The song was revived in 1953 by singer Jaye P. Morgan.

The song title gave rise to the revue of composer Ray Henderson's music called It's the Cherries, which launched the American Composer Series in 2000.

Notable recordings
Rudy Vallée & His Connecticut Yankees – 1931 single peaked at #3 on 9/19/1931
Jack Hylton - 1931
Leslie "Hutch" Hutchinson - 1931
Layton & Johnstone - 1931
Jaye P. Morgan – 1953 single debuted 12/19/1953 and peaked at #26 on pop charts in 1954.
Doris Day – The Love Album (1967) and My Heart (2011)
Judy Garland – Judy (1956)
Johnny Mathis featuring Forever Plaid – Mathis on Broadway (2000)
Lisa Loeb recorded the song as the title track to the 2007 EP Cherries

In popular culture
 In the 1981 Steve Martin mock musical, Pennies From Heaven, a performance of the song by Walter S. Harrah, Gene Merlino, Vern Rowe, Robert Tebow and Al Vescovo is used in a cutaway segment in which Martin, Bernadette Peters, and Jessica Harper lip sync to the song.
 The song is featured in the soundtrack for the 1983 documentary Seeing Red (1983 film).
 It is the opening song of the Broadway show Fosse, as sung by Ben Vereen.
 The song is featured in the soundtrack for the 2012 movie Killing Them Softly, starring Brad Pitt.
 The song is twice sung in the 2013 movie Adoration starring Robin Wright, Naomi Watts, and Ben Mendelson.
 The song is sung in an episode of ITV's Poirot ( "Third Floor Flat") while a body is discovered.

References

Songs with music by Ray Henderson
Songs with lyrics by Lew Brown
1931 songs
Great Depression songs
Judy Garland songs